Mariel may refer to:

 Mariel (given name)
 Mariel, Cuba, a municipality and city
 Mariel boatlift, a 1980 exodus of Cubans to the United States
 Mariel of Redwall, a book in the Redwall series by Brian Jacques
 Mari-El, an autonomous republic of Russia
 El Mariel, second studio album by Cuban-American rapper Pitbull

People with the given name
 Mariel Hemingway (born 1961), American actress and granddaughter of Ernest Hemingway
 Mariel Pamintuan (born 1998), Filipino actress
 Mariel Rodriguez (born 1984), Filipino host and an actress

See also 
 Marial (disambiguation)